The Gigantes de Carolina is a Puerto Rican professional basketball team in the Baloncesto Superior Nacional based in Carolina, Puerto Rico. After 12 years of inaction, they returned for the 2021 season.

History

They've participated in the Baloncesto Superior Nacional (BSN) from 1971 to 2009; with breaks in 1994, '98, '99, '05, '06, and '10. They have made the BSN Finals three times in their history, 1979 (vs. the Piratas de Quebradillas), 1997 (vs. Atléticos de San Germán), and 2008 (vs. Capitanes de Arecibo), losing them all.  

In 2008, the Gigantes advanced to the league's "Super 6" semifinals. The team earned a lead in this phase and came close to receiving a guaranteed spot in the league's final by defeating the Cangrejeros de Santurce in the final stages of the "Super 6". The Gigantes entered this series with only two games left for qualification. However, Santurce won the second game with score of 99–83. Carolina eventually won the series and eliminated Santurce. The Gigantes and the Capitanes were the teams that advanced to the finals. The series extended to seven games, with both teams winning three games at home. Arecibo won the seventh game with scores of 99–94.

Current roster

Notable players

  Joél Curbelo
  Diante Garrett
  Sheldon Mac

References

External links
 BSN Official site 
Team website (Gigantes de Carolina) 
 Profile at Eurobasket.com

BSN teams
Basketball teams established in 1971